The men's team time trial event was part of the road cycling programme at the 1980 Summer Olympics. The time for the team was stopped after the third person on the team crossed the finish line. The venue for this event was the Minskoye Shossye (Moscow - Minsk Highway), Moscow, Soviet Union. This event was held on 20 July 1980.

Final standings

References

Road cycling at the 1980 Summer Olympics
Cycling at the Summer Olympics – Men's team time trial